Memorial Stadium is a stadium in Stephenville, Texas. It is primarily used for American football, and is the home field of the Tarleton State University Texans football team. It opened in 1951, was renovated in 1977, and currently seats 24,000 people, the stadium seated 7,000 in the original configuration. In 2004, the playing surface was changed from natural grass to synthetic turf. The stadium is also the home of the Stephenville High School Yellow Jackets football team. 

In 2017 the stadium began a 26.5 million dollar expansion and renovation. This expansion involved the complete reconstruction of the west side of the stadium. A two tiered press box with club level seating was added. This resulted in the home stands being moved to the brand new west side of the stadium and the old east side for visiting fans and the old press box being used for visiting coaches and overflow media. This renovation was completed in the summer of 2019 bringing the total capacity of the stadium to 15,000. 

On October 22, 2021 it was announced that the stadium would continue expansion for the next 18 months with the planned addition of permanent end zone seating to raise the total capacity to 24,000. One day later on October 23rd, the record attendance was set at the stadium with 16,216 fans in attendance for Tarleton, versus Midwestern State. Tarleton won the contest 17–14.

References

College football venues
Sports venues in Texas
Tarleton State Texans football
American football venues in Texas
Buildings and structures in Erath County, Texas
1951 establishments in Texas
Sports venues completed in 1977
High school football venues in Texas